Bijainagar is a city and headquarters of Bijainagar tehsil in the Ajmer district of the Indian state of Rajasthan.It was founded by Shri Rao Saheb Vijay Singh ji Of Masuda in 1919 CE,This city is situated along the Khari River close to the southern border of Ajmer District.

Demographics

As of the 2011 Indian census, Bijainagar has a population of 32,124. The population is 51 percent male and 49 percent female. Bijainagar has an average literacy rate of 69 percent, which is higher than the national average of 59.5 percent. Male literacy is 78 percent and female literacy is 60 percent. 14 percent of the population is aged six or less. Most of the population practices the Hindu religion.

Geography 

The area is known as "Krishi Mandi" is the second largest region in the state of Rajasthan for the production of cotton.

The main water source is the Bisalpur Dam, which supplies Rajasthan's largest water treatment plant. The Para 1 Dam in Para is one of the major irrigation dams in the Ajmer District.

Economy 

Bijainagar is an industrial area with businesses that include the Agricultural Mandi (Market Yard), cattle feed plants, oil mills, woolen yarn mills, flour mills, ceramic industries, as well as a cotton and synthetic waste recycling plant.

Culture

Temples 

Bijainagar was the death place of Shri Pannalal Ji Maharaj, great saint of Jains, People used to visit his samadhi Shri panna guru dhyan sadhna kendra, situated at Pragya College

Bijainagar has many temples.

 Balaji Mandir (Sabji Mandi)
 Chamatkari Hanuman Mandir (Station wale Balaji)
 Church
 Digamber Jain Mandir (Sathana Baazar)
 Ganesh Mandir
 Gurudwara
 Laxmi Narayan Mandir (Bada Mandir)
 Mosque (Rajnagar)
 Nakoda Jain Temple (Rajdarbar colony)
 Radha krishna mandir (Purana mandir)
 Shani Dev Mandir
 Shiv Mandir
 Shiv Mandir (Bapu Baazar)
 Shiv Mandir (Kekri Road, Rajnagar)
 Shiv Mandir (Peepli Chouraha)
 Shri Harshiddhi Ganesh Mandir (Chosla)
 Shwetamber Jain Mandir (Mahavir Bazar)
 Shiv ji Ki Chhatari, (Kekri Road, Rajnagar)
 Shri Dev Narayan Mandir, (Near Pokhrana Factori)
 Triveni Matna Mandir (Teja Chowk)
 Sitla mata mandir
 Tejaji Mandir
 Vishwakarma Temple
 Shri panna guru dhyan sadhna kendra
 Radha krishan temple (Gopal Badi)
 Karant Wale Balaji (Subhash Nagar)
 Charbhuja temple (Rajnagar)
 Charbhuja temple (Chosla)

Transport 
Direct Rail Connectivity to major cities like Delhi , Mumbai , Surat , Ahmedabad , Kolkata , Hyderabad , Bhopal , Indore , Jammu , Haridwar , Rishikesh. The nearest airport is Kishangarh Airport 100 kms away which serves Ajmer , Kishangarh , Bijainagar, Bhilwara. Bijainagar is well connected to 6 Lane expressway which connects to major cities of India.

Education

Colleges 

Shri Pragya College, PG College
College of Science, Technology, Management, Arts and Commerce
 Sanjivani College, Bijainagar

Smt. Rama Devi B.Ed. College

Schools

Pragya International School (English Medium Only)
St. Paul's School a Roman Catholic Diocesan Secondary School CBSE(English Medium Only)
 Government Senior Secondary Schools (separate for boys and girls)
Shri Pragya Public School (situated near the state highway) www.Pragyaschool.Com 
 Saraswati Senior Secondary School Bijainagar
 Vaatsalya School (near head post office)
 Yash Bhumi Modern School (opposite railway station) bijainagar
 Ajmeru Public School, Kekri Road, Bijianagar
 Adrash Vidhya Mandir, Bijainagar
 Keshav International School, Bijainagar
 Shashikala Primary School, Bijainagar

References

Cities and towns in Ajmer district